Nicola Iannotti (born 13 July 1984) is an Italian professional footballer who plays as a midfielder for A.S.D Virtus Liburia.

References

External links
Profile at EmozioneCalcio.it 

1984 births
Living people
Association football midfielders
Italian footballers
Benevento Calcio players
U.S. Livorno 1915 players
Novara F.C. players
Aylesbury F.C. players